L.O.V.E (which stands for "Love Overcomes Virtually Everything") is the title of the second album from UK R&B / soul singer Terri Walker. The album was released in 2005 by Mercury Records and spawned 2 singles, "Whoopsie Daisy", which just missed out on a UK top 40 chart placing and "This Is My Time", which was cancelled just before the release date.

The London Daily Mirror called it "a cut above her substandard debut", and praised Walker's voice as one that "knocks competitors into the underachieving box".

Track listing 
 This Is My Time
 L.O.V.E
 Whoopsie Daisy
 Hurt By Love
 What The Hell
 Slow It Up
 Star
 Ain't No Love
 The Woman You Want
 The One That Got Away
 Feel Love
 Yes I Do

Singles

References

External links 
 Dekkor Records official website
 

2005 albums
Terri Walker albums